Łodzia (obsolete Polish for "boat") is a Polish coat of arms. It was used by many noble families of the Kingdom of Poland and the Polish–Lithuanian Commonwealth.  A variant serves as the coat of arms of the city of Łódź (the city's name literally means "Boat"). It's a classic example of the so-called canting arms well known in European heraldry as it was borne by the medieval lords de Łodzia (a feudal lordship) and their clan.  Hence the boat in the shield, clearly alluding to the estate's name literally meaning Boat. Coats of Arms in the Polish Lithuanian Commonwealth were a symbol of a heraldic clan.

History

Łodzia is one of the oldest Polish coats of arms.  Its earliest appearance (1303) is on a seal belonging to Wojciech of Krośno, Palatine of Kalisz. The first blazon description dates from 1411.

The first Łodzia coat of arms featured a golden letter M on the shield, and a boat in the crest. That version was used by Mikołaj of Łodzia in 1301.  By 1315, however, all the bearers of the coat of arms had adopted the version used by Wojciech of Krośno. Initially the coat of arms had a checkerboard background, which by 1382 had been supplanted by a plain red field.

Until the 16th century, variously shaped boats were depicted.  After the publication of Bartosz Paprocki's Herby rycerstwa polskiego (The Coats-of-Arms of Polish Chivalry, 1584), most authors adopted the present version. Paprocki was also the first to mention the crest as comprising peacock feathers with boat superimposed.

The Łodzia coat of arms was used by over 150 families, mostly around Kalisz, Poznań and Sieradz. After the Union of Horodło, it was also adopted by several Lithuanian families.

Blazon
Gules, a rudderless and mastless boat Or.

Notable bearers
Notable members of the clan and bearers of this coat of arms include:
House of Czarniecki
Stefan Czarniecki (consort Sofia Kobierzycka)
House of Opaliński
Andrzej Opaliński (1540–1593), Great Crown Marshal
Andrzej Opaliński (1575–1623), Bishop of Poznań
Łukasz de Bnin Opaliński, Castellan of Poznań
Łukasz de Bnin Opaliński, poet, Court Marshal of the Crown
House of Kurnatowski
Zygmunt Łodzia Kurnatowski
Łukasz Górka z Górki h. Łodzia, [[komornik [cen] dwór królewski (1433), podczaszy [poz] Poznań (1438), starosta generalny [poz] Wielkopolska, starosta [poz] Kościan (1441), starosta [str] pobiedziskie, wojewoda [poz] Poznań (1441-1475)]]

Gallery

External links 
  Lodzia Coat of Arms and the bearers.

See also
 Polish heraldry
 Heraldic family
 List of Polish nobility coats of arms

Bibliography
 Kasper Niesiecki: Herbarz Polski (Polish Armorial), Lwów, 1738
 Tadeusz Gajl: Herbarz polski od średniowiecza do XX wieku : ponad 4500 herbów szlacheckich 37 tysięcy nazwisk 55 tysięcy rodów. L&L, 2007. .

Polish coats of arms